Tibetan Uprising Day, observed on March 10, commemorates the 1959 Tibetan uprising against the presence of the People's Republic of China in Tibet.  The failure of the armed rebellion ultimately resulted in a violent crackdown on Tibetan independence movements, and the flight of the Dalai Lama Tenzin Gyatso into exile.

Tibetan Uprising Day is observed primarily by organizations and individuals who support Tibetan independence such as Students for a Free Tibet, and is often accompanied by the release of a statement by the Dalai Lama. Tibetan independence groups often organize protests or campaigns on March 10 to draw attention to the situation in Tibet.

In 2008, a series of riots and violent clashes broke out in the Tibetan city of Lhasa when monks were arrested during peaceful demonstrations.
The events in Lhasa triggered a nationwide uprising with protests occurring in every region. The Central Tibetan Administration estimates the number of Protests to have occurred in 2008 to be 336.

Organizations that commemorate the day
 Wisconsin Legislature
 City Government of Kaohsiung
 Students for a Free Tibet

See also 
 1959 Tibetan uprising
 Human rights in Tibet
 2008 Tibetan unrest
 Serfs Emancipation Day

Notes

References 
Iyer, Pico. The Open Road: The Global Journey of the Fourteenth Dalai Lama (2008) Alfred A. Knopf, Inc.

External links 
 Students for a Free Tibet M10 Campaign 
Uprising Archive: An archive dedicated to the 2008 uprising in Tibet
 Central Tibetan Administration
 Tibet Society

March observances
Tibetan independence movement
Day
Indigenous peoples days